Anwar Maqsood Hameedi (born 7 September 1939, Urdu:), popularly known as Anwar Maqsood, is a Pakistani scriptwriter, television presenter, satirist, humorist, and infrequent actor. He was well known for his drama write-ups for PTV in the late 1970s and 1980s.

Early life and family
Anwar Maqsood was born on 7 September 1939 in Hyderabad State. He studied at the Gulbarga Trust School in Aurangabad. His large family migrated to Karachi in 1948, after the creation of Pakistan in 1947. His childhood years were spent in PIB Colony, Karachi with his siblings and family.

Maqsood belongs to a prominent family of Pakistan and some of his siblings are well known in their own right: his sister, Fatima Surayya Bajia was a well-known writer in Pakistan and South Asia whose marriage ended early in divorce. She then chose to play a key role in the upbringing of her nine young brothers and sisters and became a maternal figure to them. Another sister Zehra Nigah, is a relatively well-known poet. One of his brothers, Ahmed Maqsood, is a former Chief Secretary Sindh; and his sister Zubaida Tariq was a cooking expert and chef. His wife, Imrana Maqsood, is a known novelist and his son, Bilal Maqsood is a rock artist, lead guitarist and vocalist of former rock band Strings. He has one daughter. A book on the life and work of Anwar Maqsood titled Uljhey Suljhey Anwar (الجھے سلجھے انور) was written by his wife, Imrana Maqsood.

Career
Anwar Maqsood has been associated for many years with PTV where he served as a presenter for a variety of their Television programs including Studio Dhai and then Studio Ponay Teen along with Show Sha and various other shows.

Works
Maqsood is often regarded as one of the leading Pakistani satirists/writers as well as highly respected in social and showbiz industry of Pakistan. Anwar Maqsood is often given credit for encouraging talented television actors like Bushra Ansari and Moin Akhter. He wrote various successful plays for television industry, including:

He also wrote the lyrics of Nestlé Nido Young Stars theme, "Meri Pyari Ammi Jaan" (English: My Dear Mother)

Education
Anwar Maqsood received his education in Pakistan. He completed his matriculation from St. Patrick's High School, Karachi. He then went on to study at the Sindh Muslim Government Law College, also in Karachi. He graduated with a degree in Law and began his career as a lawyer. However, he soon realized that his true passion was in the field of creative writing and entertainment, and he transitioned into the field of scriptwriting, television hosting, and comedy. Espere.in

Awards
 Pride of Performance Award by the Government of Pakistan in 1994
 Hilal-e-Imtiaz (Crescent of Excellence) Award by the President of Pakistan in 2013
 PTV Superstar award at PTV Awards in 2000
 Lifetime Achievement Honour at 4th Pakistan Media Awards
 Lifetime Achievement Award at the 3rd Hum Awards

See also
List of authors
List of English novelists
List of novelists
List of playwrights
List of short story writers
List of Lollywood actors
Fatima Surayya Bajia
Zubaida Tariq
Zehra Nigah

References

External links
 

Living people
Pakistani humorists
Pakistani lyricists
Pakistani dramatists and playwrights
Pakistani television writers
Pakistani male television actors
Pakistani television hosts
Urdu-language humorists
Urdu-language writers
1935 births
Hum Award winners
Writers from Karachi
Male actors from Karachi
PTV Award winners
Pakistani people of Hyderabadi descent
People from Karachi
Anwar
Male television writers
Muhajir people
Recipients of the Pride of Performance
Recipients of Hilal-i-Imtiaz